State highways in Ukraine are subdivided into three categories: international (M-network), national (H-network), and regional (P-network). The letter's indexes are in Cyrillic, standing for their respective abbreviations in Ukrainian.

List of international highways in Ukraine
International highways in Ukraine are the roads in Ukraine on routes involving international transport corridors and/or highways that are part of the European network. The international highways in Ukraine are identified with the letter M for the Ukrainian designation (Mizhnarodni), followed by the double digits 01 through 30. Usually their major routes of freeways detour around highly congested areas such as cities; however, these highways also might have some branches with the same identification signs posted while going through such congested areas. Some of these highways, especially around major cities have 8, 10, or more lanes.

Those highways encompass 4.9% of all highways in the country. In the following list, all lengths are given by the major route. When branches (or exits) are mentioned and added to the length, the total length then measured including the entire network, not as an alternative route (compare with business route).

List of national roads in Ukraine

List of regional roads in Ukraine
 P01: Kyiv - Obukhiv
 P02: Kyiv - Ivankiv - Ovruch, entrances to the Chernobyl Nuclear Power Plant (Dytiatky checkpoint) and memorial complex in Novi Petrivtsi 
 P03: Northeast Kyiv bypass, access to highway M03
 P04: Kyiv - Fastiv - Bila Tserkva - Tarascha - Zvenyhorodka, entrances No.1 and No.2 to the city of Fastiv
 P05: Dytiatky checkpoint - "Pripyat" checkpoint, entrance to the Chernobyl Nuclear Power Plant and the villages of Straholissya and Stari Sokole
 P05: Horodyshche - Sarny - Rivne - Starokostiantyniv, north and south entrances to the city of Rivne, entrance to the city of Netishyn; redesignated as H25 in 2017
 P06: "Chernobyl" checkpoint - "Ovruch" checkpoint, entrances to the cities of Pripyat and Chernobyl and the villages of Buryakivka and Maryanivka
 P06: Blahovishchenske - Voznesensk - Mykolaiv, entrance to Mykolaiv International Airport, former highway M23, redesignated as H24 in 2017
 P07: Chuhuiv - Starobelsk - Milove; redesignated as H26 in 2017
 P08: Nemyriv - Yampil
 P09: Myronivka - Kaniv - Sofiyivka
 P10: Kaniv - Chyhyryn - Kremenchuk, entrance to the village of Subotiv; former P15
 P11: Poltava - Krasnohrad
 P12: Chernihiv - Mena - Sosnytsia - Hremyach, entrance to the city of Novhorod-Siversky; redesignated as H27 in 2017
 P13: Chernihiv - Horodnia - Senkivka; redesignated as H28 in 2017
 P14: Lutsk - Kivertsi - Manevychi - Liubeshiv - Dolsk to the border with Belarus
 P15: Kovel - Volodymyr - Chervonohrad - Zhovkva, entrance to the city of Volodymyr
P15: Kaniv - Chyhyryn - Kremenchuk, entrance to the village of Subotiv; redesignated as P10 in 2009
 P16: Entrance to sensitive sites in the Crimea
 P17: Bila Tserkva - Tetiiv - Lypovets - Gumenne to highway M12
 P18: Zhytomyr - Popilnia - Skvyra - Volodarka - Stavyshche
 P19: Fastiv - Mytnytsya - Obukhiv - Rzhyshchiv
 P20: Sniatyn - Tyaziv
 P21: Dolyna - Khust
 P22: Russian border at Krasna Talivka - Luhansk
 P23: Simferopol - Feodosia
 P24: Tatariv - Kosiv - Kolomyia - Borshchiv - Kamianets-Podilskyi
 P25: Simferopol - Yevpatoria
 P26: Ostroh - Kremenets; former P105
 P27: Sevastopol - Inkerman
 P28: Belarusian border at Vystupovychi (in Mozyr) - Ovruch - Zhytomyr; now part of highway M21
 P29: Alushta - Sudak - Feodosia
 P30: Entrance to the city of Irpin
 P31: Berdychiv - Khmilnyk - Lityn to highway M12
 P32: Kremenets - Bila Tserkva - Rzhyshchiv, entrance to the city of Bila Tservka; now part of highway H02
 P33: Vinnitsa - Turbiv - Lypovets - Haisyn - Balta - Velyka Mykhailivka to highway M16; former T-02-01
 P33: Reni - Orlivka - Izmail; now part of highway M15
 P34 "Romanov Highway": Yalta - Alushta
 P35: Hrushivka - Sudak
 P36: Nemiroff - Mohyliv-Podilskyi
 P37: Enerhodar - Vasylivka
 P38: Bohorodchany - Guta
 P39: Brody - Ternopil
 P40: Rava-Ruska - Yavoriv - Sudova Vyshnia
 P41: Ternopil bypass
 P42: Lubny - Myrhorod - Opeshnya to highway H12
 P43: M19 highway - Lanivtsi to highway H02 
 P44: Sumy - Putyvl - Hlukhiv
 P45: Sumy - Krasnopillya - Bohodukhiv
 P46: Kharkiv - Okhtyrka
 P47: Kherson - Nova Kakhovka - Henichesk, entrance to "Askania Nova" nature preserve and the city of Nova Kakhovka
 P48: Kamianets-Podilskyi - Sataniv - Viitivtsi - Bilohiria
 P49: Vaskovychi - Shepetivka
 P50: Yarmolyntsi - Sataniv, entrance to Yarmolyntsi township and "Sataniv" public resort
 P51: Merefa - Lozova - Pavlohrad
 P51: Kharkiv - Krasnohrad - Pereshchepino; now part of highway M18
 P53: Malyi Bereznyi to the "Malyi Bereznyi" border checkpoint
 P54: Krasnopilka - Bershad - Dubynove; was T-02-09 before 2013
 P54: Mukachevo - Berehove to the "Luzhanka" border checkpoint; former T-07-10, redesignated as highway M24 in 2013
 P55: Odessa - Voznesensk - Novyi Buh
 P55: "Vylok" border checkpoint - Vylok - Nevetlenfalu to the "Dyakovo" border checkpoint; redesignated as highway M26 in 2013
 P56: Chernihiv - Pakul - "Slavutych" checkpoint - Chernobyl, entrance to Slavutych
 P57: Oleshky - Hola Prystan - Skadovsk, entrance to Oleshok
 P58: Sevastopol - Kamyshovaya Bukhta
 P59: Entrance to sensitive sites in the city of Sevastopol
 P60: Krolevets - Konotop - Romny - Pyriatyn
 P61: Baturyn - Konotop - Sumy, entrance to "Hetman's Capital" reserve 
 P62: Kryvorivnya - Ust-Putyla - Stari Kuty - Vyzhnytsia - Storozhynets - Chernivtsi
 P63: H03 highway - Vartikivtsi to the "Sokiryany" border checkpoint, entrances to the "Rososhany" and "Larga" border checkpoints
 P64: Kivshovata - Shushkivka - Lysianka - Moryntsi - Shevchenko - Tarasivka to highway M16
 P65: "Nikolaevka" border checkpoint - Semenivka - Novhorod-Siverskyi - Hlukhiv to the "Katerinovka" border checkpoint
 P66: "Demino-Oleksandrivka" border checkpoint - Svatove - Lysychansk - Luhansk
 P67: Chernihiv - Nizhyn - Pryluky - Pyriatyn, entrance to the town of Nizhyn
 P68: Talalaivka - Ichnia - Trostyanets - Sokyrnytsi to highway H07, entrance to "Kachanivka" historical and culture preserve
 P69: Kyiv - Vyshhorod - Desna - Chernihiv, entrance to Goncharivske village
 P70: Odessa - Bilhorod-Dnistrovskyi to highway M15 at Monashi, entrance to the port of Ilyichevsk; former T-16-04, redesignated as H33 in 2017 
 P71: Odessa - Ivanivka - Ananyiv - Pishchana - Khashchuvate - Kolodiste - Ryzhavka to highway M05
 P72: Bilhorod-Dnistrovskyi to "Starokozache" border checkpoint; was T-16-26 before 2013
 P73: Highway H08 near Dniprovi Khvyli - Nikopol; was T-08-09 before 2013
 P74: Piatykhatky - Kryvih Rih - Shyroke; was T-04-18 before 2013
 P75: "Tymkove" border checkpoint - Slobidka - Balta - Kryve Ozero - Pervomaisk - Domanivka - Oleksandrivka; former T-16-03
 P76: "Prykladnyky" border checkpoint - Zarichne - Dubrovytsia
 P77: Rivne - Tuchyn - Hoshcha to highway H25
 P78: Kharkiv - Zmiiv - Balakliya - Horokhovatka
 P79: Highway M18 - Sakhnovshchina - Izium - Kupyansk to the "Pisky" border checkpoint; former T-21-09
 P80: Kamianske - Mykolayivka - Sursko-Mykhailivka - Solone - Chervonokamyane; was T-04-17 before 2015
 P81: Kazanka - Snihurivka - Antonivka to highway P47; former T-15-05, T-15-08, T-15-09, T-15-12, T-15-17 and O-150401
 P82: Sosnytsia - Korop to highway M02; was T-25-16 before 2019
 P83: Slavutych - Liubech - Ripky - highway M01 - Horodnia - highway H28 - Snovsk - Koriukivka - Semenivka - Chaykyne to highway H27, entrance to the villages of Berezna and Brech; was T-25-12, T-25-33, T-25-37 and T-25-58 before 2019
 P84: Bibrka - Burshtyn; was T-09-10, T-14-19 and T-14-25 before 2021

See also
 Roads in Ukraine

Notes

External links
 List of M-routes 
 Declaration of Cabinet of Ministers of Ukraine on adaptation of the highways list

State Highways